Khadzhimurat Magomedovich Akkaev (born March 27, 1985 in Tyrnyauz, Kabardino-Balkaria, USSR) is a Russian weightlifter.

Career
Akkaev competed in the men's 94 kg category at the 2004 Summer Olympics in Athens, where he won a silver medal. He is 178 cm/5 ft 10 tall and weighs 105 kg/231 lb.

At the 2008 Summer Olympics in Beijing, he originally was awarded the bronze medal in the 94 kg category, with a total of 402 kg. In 2016, he was stripped of the medal after his sample tested positive for steroids.

Akkaev has moved up into −105 kg weight category as a replacement for Dmitry Lapikov and Dmitry Klokov. He won the 2011 European Weightlifting Championships in Kazan, with a total of 425 kg.

He became the 2011 World Champion in Paris, beating his compatriot Dmitry Klokov by 2 kg with a total of 430 kg.

Akkaev was scheduled to compete at the 2012 Summer Olympics in the 105 kg class but was forced to withdraw due to a back injury. On January 13, 2012 Akkaev was found to have failed a doping test prior to 2012 Olympic Games. He was provisionally suspended in January 2017, and finally in January 2019 he was disqualified for eight years, starting from 2 August 2016 until 1 August 2024.

Major results

References

1985 births
Living people
People from Elbrussky District
Russian male weightlifters
World Weightlifting Championships medalists
Olympic weightlifters of Russia
Weightlifters at the 2004 Summer Olympics
Weightlifters at the 2008 Summer Olympics
Olympic silver medalists for Russia
Olympic medalists in weightlifting
Medalists at the 2004 Summer Olympics
Competitors stripped of Summer Olympics medals
Doping cases in weightlifting
Russian sportspeople in doping cases
European Weightlifting Championships medalists
Sportspeople from Kabardino-Balkaria
20th-century Russian people
21st-century Russian people